Azonto Ghost is a Ghanaian movie that features Liwin as the main character. In the movie he was killed by his sibling because their dad left a large chunk of his inheritance for him. His ghost hunted them and killed them one after the other. When he was alive he loves to dance Azonto. So anytime he launches an attack on any of his relatives he has to dance first.

Cast 
 Kwadwo Imafidon (Liwin)
 Bill Asamoah
 Patricia Bentum
 Benedicta Ghafa

In popular culture 
This movie was the inspiration of a popular meme where Liwin's father says "Oh my God! Wow!" in a happy way.

References

Ghanaian drama films